Shiloh is an unincorporated community in Raleigh County in the U.S. state of West Virginia. Shiloh is located along West Virginia Secondary Route 13.

Unincorporated communities in Raleigh County, West Virginia
Unincorporated communities in West Virginia